Uthal is a city of Lasbela District in the Balochistan province of  Pakistan. Uthal is headquarters of Uthal Tehsil an administrative subdivision of the district.

Demography
The Bela population consists principally of Baloch, followed by Sindhis and Pashtuns. The population is predominantly Muslim.

Education
The Lasbela University of Agriculture, Water and Marine Science is located in Uthal.

References

Union councils of Lasbela District
Populated places in Lasbela District